Grapevine Canyon may refer to:

Grapevine Canyon (Kern County, California), the original Spanish name was La Cañada de las Uvas.
Grapevine Canyon (Death Valley)
Grapevine Canyon (Nevada)
Grapevine Canyon Petroglyphs
Grapevine Canyon (San Diego County), a tributary of San Felipe Creek

See also 
Grapevine (disambiguation)